Zhen'an District is a district of the city of Dandong, Liaoning, People's Republic of China.

Administrative divisions
There are four subdistricts and five towns in the district. Taiping Bay Subdistrict is an exclave.

Subdistricts:
Yalu River Subdistrict, Zhenzhu Subdistrict, Taiping Bay Subdistrict, Jinkuang Subdistrict

Towns:
Wulongbei, Loufang, Tangshancheng, Tongxing, Jiuliancheng

References

External links

County-level divisions of Liaoning